The tactical crew of a modern military aircraft are the crew members trained and skilled in the use of the aircraft and its warfare systems during combat. They are often directed by a tactical coordinator (tacco) and range from three to nine members. Their responsibilities include directing the pilot(s) on the best way to engage the enemy. The tactical crew operate sensors to detect the enemy, make decisions about the situation and then may direct, local or remote weapons and ordnance to neutralise the activities of the enemy's weapons.

In some military forces the tactical crewmembers may also have duties in maintaining the tactical systems when the aircraft is on the ground.

See also
Aircrew member

Military aviation occupations